Sir Henry Felix Woods Pasha (1843–1929), KCVO, also known as Woods Pasha, was a British-Ottoman admiral and a pasha in Imperial Ottoman Naval Service.

A British naval officer, Woods was born in Jersey in 1843 and educated at the Upper School of Greenwich Hospital (London), which offered training for the Royal Navy. After finishing at the top of his class, he entered as a Masters Assistant. On 17 October 1867, he was appointed a Navigating Lieutenant (a rank which was formally known as the Master).

He was attached to the British Embassy in the Ottoman Empire, and eventually joined the Imperial Ottoman Navy, where he was given the rank of Admiral. He was Aide-de-Camp for some years to Sultan Abdul Hamid II. After Abdul Hamid was deposed, he was reported by The New York Times to be present at the 1909 coronation of the succeeding sultan, Mehmed V.

Woods Pascha was invested as a Knight Commander of the Royal Victorian Order (KCVO) by King Edward VII at Buckingham Palace on 11 August 1902. He was awarded the Grand Cordon of the Medjidie and Osminieh and was a Knight Commander of the Saxe-Coburg Order. He died in 1929 in Constantinople (modern Istanbul).

Publications

References 

1843 births
1929 deaths
Jersey military personnel
Pashas
Royal Navy officers
Honours recipients from Jersey
Knights Commander of the Royal Victorian Order
Recipients of the Order of the Medjidie
People educated at the Royal Hospital School
British emigrants to the Ottoman Empire